MAGIC, also known as The Magazine for Magicians, was an independent magazine for magicians that was based in Las Vegas, Nevada. A creation of Stan Allen, it debuted in September 1991, with its first issue featuring Lance Burton on the cover, and over the years it also featured David Copperfield, Siegfried & Roy, Penn & Teller, Mike Caveney, and Mac King. Its final issue was #301, November 2016.

Writers for the magazine have included Joshua Jay, Gabe Fajuri, John Lovick, Alan Howard, Max Maven, Peter Duffie, Andi Gladwin, Mark Nelson, Rory Johnston, Timothy Hyde and Shawn McMaster.

In 2005 MAGIC Magazine was deemed the world's largest-selling publication for magicians by Guinness World Records.

In 2007 MAGIC Magazine was also listed as one of the Chicago Tribune's 50 favorite magazines in their annual summer list.

MAGIC Live! 
In 2001 it was announced that MAGIC would be producing a once-in-a-lifetime, never-to-be-repeated event called MAGIC Live. The purpose of the event was to bring to life the stories and features of the print magazine and to immerse MAGIC subscribers in the stories they read each month. The "unconventional convention" took place August 19–22, 2001 at The Orleans Hotel & Casino in Las Vegas, Nevada.

Due to the critical acclaim for the sold-out event and the urging of many attendees Stan Allen announced an encore event to take place in August 2004. The second event proved to be just as groundbreaking as the first, including a performance of close-up magic in which guests viewed the show as if in a bar, restaurant, trade show floor, and theatre via four connected performance venues.

In August 2007 MAGIC Live returned to The Orleans hotel for a third time. The event sold out in record time and many would-be attendees sat on a waiting list in hopes of making it to the convention.

In the June 2008 issue of MAGIC it was announced that MAGIC Live would take place August 16–19, 2009 at the South Point Hotel & Casino. The convention featured an innovative dealer's room designed and produced by Brian South as well as a performance of the one man play "The Expert at The Cardtable" by Guy Hollingworth.

A fifth iteration of MAGIC Live took place August 14–17, 2011, coinciding with the 20th anniversary of MAGIC Magazine.

The sixth MAGIC Live convention was held August 11–14, 2013 in Las Vegas, Nevada. One of the highlights of the convention was the final performance of Johnny Thompson performing his Dove Act as The Great Tomsoni.

References

External links 
 Official magazine website
 Official event page for Magic LIVE!

1991 establishments in Nevada
2016 disestablishments in Nevada
Monthly magazines published in the United States
Defunct magazines published in the United States
Magic periodicals
Magazines established in 1991
Magazines disestablished in 2016
Magazines published in Nevada
Mass media in Las Vegas